Mamuju is the capital of the Indonesian province of West Sulawesi. The town was formerly part of South Sulawesi province.

Education 

Education in Mamuju extends up to SMA III (Year 12) and people from surrounding areas (especially the area of Kalumpang) will travel to Mamuju to further their education. Students who wish to pursue a tertiary education must travel to larger towns like Makassar.

Agriculture 

Agriculture in this area includes jackfruit, rambutan, durian, rice, and bananas.

Demographics 

Like many places in West Sulawesi, Mamuju is a predominantly Muslim town, with many mosques. However, Christianity has established a presence with several churches in this town, in addition to a small contingent of Buddhists.

Climate
Mamuju has a tropical rainforest climate (Köppen Af) with heavy rainfall year-round.

Culture

An annual sandeq race takes place every August from Mamuju to Makassar.

Twin towns – sister cities

Mamuju is twinned with:
 Gorontalo City, Gorontalo, Indonesia
 Soweto, Gauteng, South Africa

References

External links

Districts of West Sulawesi
Populated places in West Sulawesi
Provincial capitals in Indonesia
Regency seats of West Sulawesi